Nikolay Koslov (1928 – 2007) was a Soviet/Russian cross-country skier who competed in the 1950s. He won a silver medal in the 4 x 10 km at the 1954 FIS Nordic World Ski Championships.

External links
World Championship results 
Biography of Nikolay Koslov 

1928 births
2007 deaths
Soviet male cross-country skiers
FIS Nordic World Ski Championships medalists in cross-country skiing